{{Taxobox
| name = Pachypanchax sp. nov. 'Analava| image = 
| status = DD | status_system = IUCN3.1
| regnum = Animalia
| phylum = Chordata
| classis = Actinopterygii
| ordo = Cyprinodontiformes
| familia = Aplocheilidae
| genus = Pachypanchax
| species = P. sp. nov. 'Analava'| binomial = Pachypanchax sp. nov. 'Analava| binomial_authority = 
| synonyms = 
}}Pachypanchax sp. nov. 'Analava' is a species of fish in the family Aplocheilidae. It is endemic to Madagascar.  Its natural habitat is rivers.

Sources
 Loiselle, P. & participants of the CBSG/ANGAP CAMP "Faune de Madagascar" workshop 2004.  Pachypanchax sp. nov. 'Analava'.   2006 IUCN Red List of Threatened Species.   Downloaded on 4 August 2007.

Pachypanchax
Freshwater fish of Madagascar
Undescribed vertebrate species
Taxonomy articles created by Polbot
Taxobox binomials not recognized by IUCN